Echineulima is a genus of sea snails, marine gastropod mollusks in the family Eulimidae.

Species
The species within this genus include the following:
 Echineulima asthenosomae (Warén, 1980)
 Echineulima biformis (G. B. Sowerby III, 1897)
 Echineulima leucophaes (Tomlin & Shackleford, 1913)
 Echineulima mittrei (Petit de la Saussaye, 1851)
 Echineulima ovata (Pease, 1861)
 Echineulima palucciae (Fischer, 1864)
 Echineulima philippinarum (G. B. Sowerby III, 1900)
 Echineulima ponderi (Warén, 1980)
 Echineulima robusta (Pease, 1860)
 Echineulima thaanumi (Pilsbry, 1921)
 Echineulima toki (Habe, 1974)

Species brought into synonymy
 Echineulima apiculata (Souverbie, 1862): synonym of Echineulima mittrei (Petit de la Saussaye, 1851)
 Echineulima dubia (Baird, 1873): synonym of Echineulima mittrei (Petit de la Saussaye, 1851)
 Echineulima eburnea (Deshayes, 1863): synonym of Echineulima mittrei (Petit de la Saussaye, 1851)
 Echineulima palucciae [sic]: synonym of Echineulima paulucciae (P. Fischer, 1864)
 Echineulima tokiokai (Habe, 1952): synonym of Echineulima mittrei (Petit de la Saussaye, 1851)

References

External links
 To World Register of Marine Species

Eulimidae